Undercover Boss (Bos Be'hasva'a is a 2013 Israeli reality television series based on the British series of the same name. Each episode depicts a person who has a high management position at a major business, deciding to become undercover as an entry-level employee to discover the faults in the company.

Format 
Each episode features a high-ranking executive or the owner of a corporation going undercover as an entry-level employee in their own company. The executives alter their appearance and assume an alias and fictional back-story. The fictitious explanation given for the accompanying camera crew is that the executives are being filmed as part of a documentary about entry-level workers in a particular industry. They spend approximately one week undercover, working in various areas of their company operations, with a different job and in most cases a different location each day. They are exposed to a series of predicaments with amusing results, and invariably spend time getting to know the people who work in the company, learning about their professional and personal challenges.

At the end of their week undercover, the executives return to their true identity and request the employees they worked with individually to corporate headquarters. The bosses reveal their identity, and reward hard-working employees through campaign, promotion, or financial rewards, while other employees are given training or better working conditions.

Episodes

Series 1: 2013

Note: Episode 6 did not focus on a new company, it was filmed 6 months after the original ones, as a follow up.

Series 2: 2015
A second season was picked up, which aired in 2015 and contained 9 additional episodes.

Criticism
Many criticized the show for focusing too much on the company. By focusing on the company rather than the interaction, critics said the show became just one big advertisement for the companies.

See also
Television in Israel

References 

Undercover Boss
2013 Israeli television series debuts
Israeli reality television series
Israeli television series based on British television series